Nicolás Iván González (born 6 April 1998) is an Argentine professional footballer who plays as a forward for Serie A club Fiorentina and the Argentina national team.

Club career

Argentinos Juniors
After over ten years in the club's youth system, González made his professional debut for Argentinos Juniors in a 2015–16 Copa Argentina defeat to Deportivo Laferrere of Primera C Metropolitana in July 2016. He made his Primera B Nacional debut on 28 August against San Martín prior to scoring the first of his four goals in 2016–17 on 23 April 2017, getting the winner versus Atlético Paraná. In total, González made twenty appearances in 2016–17, a season which ended with Argentinos winning promotion to the Argentine Primera División. He scored on his first top-flight start, scoring the opening goal in a defeat to Belgrano.

VfB Stuttgart
On 10 July 2018, González signed a five-year contract with VfB Stuttgart. He scored twice on his unofficial debut for the club, netting in a friendly victory over FV Illertissen on 18 July. His first competitive goal arrived during a home loss to Schalke 04 on 22 December. They were relegated at the end of 2018–19, with González subsequently scoring the winner on his 2. Bundesliga bow against FC St. Pauli on 17 August 2019. He scored consecutive braces in June 2020 against Sandhausen and Nürnberg; the latter fixture was his 100th league appearance for Stuttgart.

On 25 November 2020, González extended his contract with VfB Stuttgart until June 2024.

Fiorentina
On 23 June 2021, González signed a five-year contract with Serie A club Fiorentina until 2026. On 13 August, González made his debut for Fiorentina in a 4–0 win against Serie B side Cosenza in the first round of Coppa Italia scoring the second goal in the 37th minute.

International career
In July 2019, González received a call-up from the Argentina Olympic Team for that year's Pan American Games in Peru. After receiving a red card on debut versus Ecuador, he played again in the semi-final and the gold medal match when Argentina won the tournament. Months later, González was selected by Lionel Scaloni's senior team for the first time ahead of October friendlies with Germany and Ecuador. He did not feature in the matchday squad against Germany, but did appear for his international bow during a 6–1 victory over Ecuador at the Estadio Manuel Martínez Valero in Elche on 13 October.

González scored his first goal for Argentina on 12 November 2020 in a 2022 FIFA World Cup qualifier against Paraguay during a crucial match that ended 1–1. He netted again days later versus Peru.

González was a member of the 2021 Copa América winning side, making five appearances in the tournament, four as a starter and one as substitute in the final against Brazil. He was also called up to Argentina's 2022 FIFA World Cup squad, but was forced to withdraw with a muscular injury three days before the start of the tournament, being replaced by Ángel Correa.

Personal life 
On 26 October 2021 he tested positive for COVID-19.

Career statistics

Club

International

Scores and results list Argentina's goal tally first, score column indicates score after each González goal.

Honours
Argentinos Juniors
Primera B Nacional: 2016–17

Argentina Olympic
Pan American Games: 2019

Argentina
Copa América: 2021
CONMEBOL–UEFA Cup of Champions: 2022

Individual
Bundesliga Rookie of the Month: January 2019

References

External links

Profile at the ACF Fiorentina website 

1998 births
Living people
People from Escobar Partido
Argentine footballers
Argentina international footballers
Argentina youth international footballers
Footballers at the 2019 Pan American Games
Pan American Games gold medalists for Argentina
Pan American Games medalists in football
Medalists at the 2019 Pan American Games
2021 Copa América players
Copa América-winning players
Association football forwards
Primera Nacional players
Argentine Primera División players
Bundesliga players
2. Bundesliga players
Serie A players
Argentinos Juniors footballers
VfB Stuttgart players
ACF Fiorentina players
Argentine expatriate footballers
Expatriate footballers in Germany
Argentine expatriate sportspeople in Germany
Expatriate footballers in Italy
Argentine expatriate sportspeople in Italy
Footballers from Buenos Aires